The 1995 ADAC Super Touren Wagen Cup was the second edition of the Super Tourenwagen Cup (STW).

Teams and drivers

Race calendar and results

Championship results

 Race 14 AVUS: half points awarded for 75% distance not completed

† Drivers did not finish the race, but were classified as they completed over 90% of the race distance.
 Race 14: Half points awarded for 75% distance not completed

Manufacturers' Trophy

Teams' Trophy

Footnotes

External links 
 1995 Super Tourenwagen Cup season at supertouringregister.com, accessed May 23, 2014

Super Tourenwagen Cup
Super Tourenwagen Cup Season